The Belgian city of Antwerp consists of nine former municipalities (called deelgemeenten) which have the special status of district.
 Antwerp
 Berchem
 Berendrecht-Zandvliet-Lillo
 Borgerhout
 Deurne
 Ekeren
 Hoboken
 Merksem
 Wilrijk

Status of district in Belgium 
Most Belgian municipalities are made up of former municipalities that were merged in the past. Called deelgemeenten, they do not have any political meaning, as only the current, "larger" municipalities have elected councils.

However, Article 41 of the Belgian Constitution provides for the possibility of implementing districts for any municipality with at least 100,000 inhabitants. In such cases, the districts have elected "district councils" and a "district college", but only Antwerp has made use of that provision.

Other cities in which the provision theoretically could be implemented are Ghent, Bruges and Leuven in Flanders; Charleroi, Liège and Namur in Wallonia; and the City of Brussels, Anderlecht and Schaerbeek in Brussels Region (although Anderlecht and Schaerbeek do not contain other former municipalities).

There have repeatedly been proposals to merge the 19 municipalities of Brussels into a single municipality.

External links 
 

 
Geography of Antwerp
Districts